Digrammia neptaria, the dark-bordered granite, is a species of geometrid moth in the family Geometridae. It is found in Central America and North America.

The MONA or Hodges number for Digrammia neptaria is 6396.

References

Further reading

External links

 

Macariini
Articles created by Qbugbot
Moths described in 1858